The sixth season of the sports entertainment reality competition series Australian Ninja Warrior premiered on 27 June 2022 on the Nine Network. The season is hosted by Leila McKinnon, Jim Courier and Will & Woody.

Production

On 15 September 2021, the series was officially renewed for a sixth season at Nine's upfronts. In October 2021, Fordham quit as series host. In November 2021, Nine announced Maddern’s contract was not renewed  and she would be leaving the network effective immediately, in which she will be resigning as the show's host. In January 2022, Jim Courier and Leila McKinnon were announced as the new hosts of the series, with Will & Woody as sideline commentators.

Format Changes
Power round - instead of the power tower, this season has the power pool. The top 4 from each round fend off in 2 rounds, beginning with a chase across the water, into a rope climb, then across 3 laches, onto another rope to the buzzer, the first ones to hit their buzzers than go to a final round where the winner receives an advantage in the semi-finals.
Advantage - the winner of the power pool receives an advantage for the semi-final, in which they are able to choose their opponent for the semi-final obstacle.
Semi-finals - the semi-final obstacle course for the first time will be a head to head race, with the winner of each race heading directly to the Grand Final.
Advantage - the ninja who runs the fastest and furthest (or fastest to complete the obstacle) will receive an advantage in the Grand Final.
Grand final - the grand final stage 1 obstacle course for the first time will be a head to head race, with the winner of each race continuing on the course but must complete the course within the time limit to progress to stage 2.

Rounds

Underline represents the contestant who won the advantage in the semi-finals in the qualifying heats as a result of winning the head to head competition in the Power Pool.

Italics denotes female competitors.

Episode 1

Heat 1

This episode aired on 27 June 2022. Only eight competitors completed this course, with a large number of athletes bowing out on the Anaconda. Newcomer athlete Ash Campbell was given an advantage for the semi-finals, after beating returning athlete David Lack in the Power Pool.

Shrinking Steps
Eagles Claw
Domino Effect
Anaconda
Ring Chaser
Warped Wall

Episode 2

Heat 2

This episode aired on 28 June 2022. Only five competitors completed this course, with a large number of athletes bowing out on the Anaconda. Returning athlete Bryson Klein was given an advantage for the semi-finals, after beating returning athlete Mat Hutchins-Read in the Power Pool.

Shrinking Steps
Candy Cane Rush
Domino Effect
Anaconda
Weight For It
Warped Wall

Episode 3

Heat 3

This episode aired on 29 June 2022. Only seven competitors completed this course, with a large number of athletes bowing out on the Anaconda. Returning athlete Matthew Bowles was given an advantage for the semi-finals, after beating returning athlete Olivia Vivian in the Power Pool.

Shrinking Steps
Candy Cane Rush
Domino Effect
Anaconda
Flying Shelf Grab to Corkscrew
Warped Wall

Episode 4

Heat 4

This episode aired on 3 July 2022. Only seven competitors completed this course, with a large number of athletes equally bowing out on the Anaconda & Ring Chaser. Returning athlete Zak Stolz was given an advantage for the semi-finals, after beating returning athlete Jake Baker in the Power Pool.

Shrinking Steps 
Eagles Claw
Domino Effect
Anaconda
Ring Chaser
Warped Wall

Episode 5

Semi-final 1

This episode aired on 4 July 2022. Two competitors completed this course. Returning athlete Olivia Vivian received a second chance advantage for the Grand Final, after being the furthest and fastest to complete the semi-final course.

  Head to Head: 
 Sprinting Steps		
Launchpad to Trapeze		
Log Dash		
Salmon Ladder to Ring Toss		
Wing Nuts		
Warped Wall		
  Solo Run: 
Double Dipper
Beehive
Dragon’s Back

Episode 6

Semi-final 2

This episode aired on 5 July 2022. Two competitors completed this course. Returning athlete Ashlin Herbert received a second chance advantage for the Grand Final, after being the furthest and fastest to complete the semi-final course.

  Head to Head: 
 Sprinting Steps		
Launchpad to Trapeze		
Log Dash		
Salmon Ladder to Ring Toss		
Wing Nuts		
Warped Wall		
  Solo Run: 
Double Dipper
Beehive
Dragon’s Back

Episode 7

Semi-final 3

This episode aired on 6 July 2022. Three competitors completed this course. Returning athlete Jake Baker received a second chance advantage for the Grand Final, after being the furthest and fastest to complete the semi-final course.

  Head to Head: 
 Sprinting Steps		
Launchpad to Bag	
Log Dash		
Salmon Ladder to Ring Toss		
Dropping Shelves	
Warped Wall		
  Solo Run: 
Double Dipper
Beehive
Dragon’s Back

Episode 8

Grand Final Stage 1

This episode aired on 10 July 2022. Like the semi-finals, the grand final Stage 1 course was a head-to-head race, with the winner continuing on the course but the winner needed to complete the course within the time limit of 5:10 to progress to Stage 2. 11 competitors completed the Stage 1 course and moved on to Stage 2.

  Head to Head: 
 Sprinting Steps		
Launchpad to Eagles Claw	
Cat Grab	
Salmon Ladder to Bar Hop	
Spring Forward
Warped Wall		
  Solo Run: 
Lightning Bolts
Triple Corkscrew
Underwater Escape

Obstacles by episode

Heats (episodes 1-4)

Semi-Finals (episodes 5-7)

Grand Finals (episodes 8-9)

Viewership

References

Australian Ninja Warrior
2022 Australian television seasons